"Too Close to Hate" is the third and final single from American rock band Sevendust's debut eponymous album. "Too Close to Hate" peaked at number 39 on the Mainstream Rock charts and was included on the Best Of (Chapter One 1997–2004) Sevendust compilation album.

Track listing

Release history

References

Sevendust songs
1997 songs
1998 singles
Songs written by John Connolly (musician)
Songs written by Clint Lowery
Songs written by Morgan Rose
Songs written by Lajon Witherspoon
Songs written by Vinnie Hornsby
TVT Records singles